Oscar Freire is a station on Line 4-Yellow of the São Paulo Metro operated by ViaQuatro. Its opening was scheduled for 2017, same year of the opening of Higienópolis-Mackenzie station. After its opening date was delayed many times, on 31 March 2018, during opening ceremony of CPTM Line 13-Jade, Governor Geraldo Alckmin finally confirmed the opening of Oscar Freire station for 4 April 2018. On 21 April 2018, it started working in full commercial time.

Characteristics
Station in the underground with side platforms and support rooms above the ground, with apparent concrete structures and distribution catwalk in metallic structure, fixated with braces above the platform. It has access for people with disabilities.

Station layout

References

São Paulo Metro stations
Railway stations located underground in Brazil
Railway stations opened in 2018
2018 establishments in Brazil